Bannaventa or Benaventa was a Romano-British fortified town which was on the Roman road later called Watling Street, which today is here, as in most places, the A5 road. Bannaventa straddles the boundaries of Norton and Whilton, Northamptonshire, England, villages highly clustered  and double that away, respectively.

Iter II (Watling Street)
The road on which Bannaventa lies is thought to be the first built by the Romans in Britain. It begins in Portus Ritupis (Richborough in Kent) and runs in successive north westerly directions – via many Roman towns.

Name
Bannaventa is derived from Brittonic *bannā "peak, hill" (as in Modern Welsh ban, "top, tip, point, summit, crest, peak, beacon, height, pinnacle, turret, hill, mountain, bare hill") and *wentā, of obscure origin, but perhaps "place of sacrifice" or simply "place, field" (as in Welsh cadwent "battlefield")

Brief mention of the settlement is thrice found in Emperor Antoninus Pius’s Itinerarium, Iter Britanniarum (The Road Routes of Antoninus Augustus):<ref>Borough Hill (Daventry) and its History', William Edgar, Page 53  ASIN: B001075ZNY</ref> 

 Iter 2, Venone XII, Benaventa XVII, Lactodorum XII.
 Iter 6, Lactodorum XVI, Isannavantia XII, Tripontium XII.
 Iter 8, Venone XII, Benaventa XVIII, Magiovinter XXVIII.
The sites of these names are as follows:
Venone = High Cross, Wigston Parva, Leicestershire
Lactodorum = Towcester, Northamptonshire
Isannavantia = Bannaventa – assumed.
Tripontium = Cave's Inn, Warwickshire
Magiovinter = Dropshort, Buckinghamshire

This emperor died in 161 CE.
Description

Bannaventa was a staging post for Romano-Celtic travellers and would have operated along the lines of the coaching towns of a later period along Watling Street. The town would have been a vital part of the road infrastructure of Roman Britain. The fortified town would provide a safe, warm resting place where provisions for the journey could be bought and horses and other livestock could be safely stabled overnight. The town would also provide some protection for the wider local allies in times of danger. Close to the town are other Roman sites, connected in time. These include the remains of a villa on the summit of nearby Borough Hill, another smaller settlement between Thrupp Lodge and Thrupp Grounds and two other small homesteads, and a more western Roman villa.

Rediscovery
It was not until the early 18th century that the site of Bannaventa was positively identified. Previously, sites at nearby Weedon Bec, Daventry's Borough Hill and even Northampton had been suggested. There have been many archaeological finds across the site including the discovery of a skeleton and numerous cremations in a Roman burial ground a little south of the boundary of the fortifications. Other discoveries include Constantinian coins, some foundations, stonework, and pottery; most were found in the early 18th century and they led to the definitive location of the town. More finds in the 20th century have been discovered and are listed below:

A number of rubbish pits dating from the 1st and 2nd century
In 1900, Roman coins of Victorinus and Samian ware, remnants of buildings including wall plaster, rotten wood, roof slates, and a cobbled floor.
 In 1922 Roman coins including a Sestertius of Hadrian.
 In 1957 a Large Nene Valley beaker, large painted pot, part of a glass bowl. Fragments of a black Samian pot plus many other artifacts.

In 1970 the site was photographed from the air. This revealed the position of the street which was more true north-south as it bisected the town, and the outline of the town mostly to the west of the A5. The settlement was enclosed by an imperfect square (distended to the south-east) with broad rounded corners, bounded by a series of three sets of banks and ditches. The enclosed town measured . In the enclosure lies evidence of the wooden buildings which made up most of the town.

Current status
Nothing obviously Roman now remains above ground and has no public access, and is privately owned and is a field. It is a Scheduled Ancient Monument.

Similarity to name of Saint Patrick's birthplace
Saint Patrick, patron saint of Ireland, tells us in his Confession that he had been born in a settlement called Bannavem Taburniae. The location is unknown, but could be a variant of Bannaventa. This led at least one historian of this county to opine that Patrick was born at Bannaventa. 

However an early Life of Patrick describes his birthplace as "near the western sea", easing the rest of Patrick's confession that he was carried into slavery in Ireland by Irish raiders. Likewise, per co-authors of a scholarly national typography of 1979, the suffix "Taburniae" is likely to distinguish it from Bannaventa.

Footnotes and references
Footnotes

ReferencesTripontium'', by Jack Lucas FSA (1997)

External links

Roman-Britain.org – info about Bannaventa

History of Northamptonshire
Roman towns and cities in England
Former populated places in Northamptonshire
Archaeological sites in Northamptonshire
West Northamptonshire District